Robert Ross Palmer (born September 10, 1956) is a Canadian former professional ice hockey player who played 320 games in the National Hockey League.  He played with the Los Angeles Kings and New Jersey Devils. As a youth, he played in the 1968 and 1969 Quebec International Pee-Wee Hockey Tournaments with minor ice hockey teams from Toronto.

Career statistics

References

External links

1956 births
Living people
Calgary Cowboys draft picks
Canadian ice hockey defencemen
Houston Apollos players
Ice hockey people from Ontario
Indianapolis Checkers players
Los Angeles Kings draft picks
Los Angeles Kings players
Maine Mariners players
Michigan Wolverines men's ice hockey players
New Haven Nighthawks players
New Jersey Devils players
Springfield Falcons players
Sportspeople from Sarnia